DCN1-like protein 1 is a protein that in humans is encoded by the DCUN1D1 gene.

DCUN1D1 is amplified in several cancer types, including squamous cell cancers, and may act as an oncogenic driver in cancer cells.

Interactions 

DCUN1D1 has been shown to interact with:
 CAND1, 
 CUL1, 
 CUL2,
 CUL3 and
 RBX1.

References

Further reading